Events from the year 1971 in Pakistan.

Incumbents

Federal government
President: Yahya Khan (until 20 December), Zulfikar Ali Bhutto (starting 20 December)
Prime Minister: Nurul Amin (starting 7 December and ending 20 December)
Chief Justice: Hamoodur Rahman

Governors
Governor of Balochistan: Riaz Hussain (until 25 December); Ghous Bakhsh Raisani (starting 25 December)
Governor of Khyber Pakhtunkhwa: K.M. Azhar Khan (until 25 December); Hayat Sherpao (starting 25 December)
Governor of Punjab: Attiqur Rahman (until 25 December); Ghulam Mustafa Khar (starting 25 December)
Governor of Sindh: Rahman Gul (until 20 December); Mumtaz Bhutto (starting 20 December)

Events
The non-cooperation movement in East Pakistan from 1 March to 25 March.
Widespread chaos and military crackdown in East Pakistan following the failure to recognize the elected majority party Awami League.
Guerrillas (Mukti Bahini) start the Bangladesh Liberation War in East Pakistan.
India aids the rebels and invaded East Pakistan begins the war in the first week of December and inflicts a crushing defeat on Pakistan Military in just a fortnight, thus creating the state of Bangladesh.

Births
2 January – Aamer Nazir, cricketer
26 November – Ch Sajjad Ali was born in Chakswari, Mirpur, AJK, Pakistan

See also
 1970 in Pakistan
 Other events of 1971
 1972 in Pakistan
 List of Pakistani films of 1971
 Timeline of Pakistani history

 
History of East Pakistan
 
1971 in Asia